is a Japanese professional baseball pitcher for the Toronto Blue Jays of Major League Baseball (MLB). He previously played for the Seattle Mariners in MLB and for the Saitama Seibu Lions of Nippon Professional Baseball (NPB).

Amateur career
As a high school pitcher, Kikuchi had a fastball that was clocked at 154 km/h (96 mph) in 2009. In October 2009, Kikuchi sparked controversy when it was announced that he was considering bypassing the amateur draft in Japan for the NPB and signing with an American Major League Baseball club. Under Major League Baseball's current rules, Kikuchi would not have been subject to the MLB Draft and instead be declared a free agent, free to sign with any American team he wanted. The Texas Rangers were one of several teams interested in signing Kikuchi, as well as the Boston Red Sox. Japanese news service reports also identified scouts from the Los Angeles Dodgers, Seattle Mariners, New York Mets, Cleveland Indians, Chicago Cubs, San Francisco Giants, Detroit Tigers, Atlanta Braves and New York Yankees watching Kikuchi in tournaments. All 12 NPB teams were also reportedly interested in signing the pitcher.

Hanamaki Higashi manager Hiroshi Sasaki submitted paperwork to the high school baseball federation in Iwate Prefecture on Kikuchi's behalf, stating his desire to turn pro. The move opened the way for professional teams to make contact with Kikuchi in a race to secure his services. With the submission of the paperwork, Kikuchi was open to be named in the Japanese baseball draft, which began on October 29, 2009. He was expected to be named as a No. 1 draft pick by several Japanese clubs. NPB had asked that Kikuchi not receive an offer from any major league clubs before Japan's draft, in order to even the chances for Japanese teams, who are not allowed to make offers before the draft. Kikuchi helped Hanamaki Higashi to a runnerup finish at the national high school invitational in April and to the semifinals in the national championship in August. Kikuchi had reportedly expressed a preference to play in the United States and even visited in October.

Kikuchi would have been the first Japanese high school player to bypass the domestic amateur draft to come to MLB. By staying, players lock themselves into nine seasons before they're eligible for free agency. They can leave only if their Japanese team allows them to enter the posting system in which MLB teams can bid for the right to negotiate with them. Furthermore, leaving for an American team bans players from Japanese leagues for three years. Kikuchi held talks with the Red Sox, Dodgers, Rangers, and Giants on Monday, October 19, and talks with the Yankees, Mets, and Mariners the following day. He decided to stay in Japan and enter the draft instead of playing in the United States.

Professional career

Saitama Seibu Lions

On November 20, 2009, Kikuchi signed a pro deal with the Saitama Seibu Lions; the deal included a 100 million yen (about $1 million) signing bonus, a 15 million yen ($150,000) first year salary, and 50 million yen ($500,000) in performance bonuses.

After the 2011 season, Seibu announced that Kikuchi would join the Melbourne Aces of the Australian Baseball League (ABL).

On December 3, 2018, Seibu announced it was allowing Kikuchi to enter the posting system to play in Major League Baseball (MLB), with the 30-day period starting a month later.

Seattle Mariners

On January 2, 2019, Kikuchi signed a four-year contract with the Seattle Mariners. Kikuchi made his MLB debut on March 21, 2019, going 4.2 innings while allowing two runs (one earned) and striking out three. He is the first Japanese-born player to make his MLB debut in Japan. Kikuchi struggled in his first season with Seattle, going 6–11 with an ERA of 5.46 in 32 starts. He struck out 116 in  innings. Kikuchi improved his performance in 2020, recording a 5.17 ERA and increasing his strikeout percentage from 16.1% to 24%.

Kikuchi was selected for the American League's roster in the 2021 Major League Baseball All-Star Game.

Toronto Blue Jays
On March 14, 2022, Kikuchi signed a three-year, $36 million contract with the Toronto Blue Jays.

On September 30, 2022, a day after cinching a post-season berth, Kikuchi earned his first MLB save.

Playing style
He mainly throws an above-average slider in addition to the fastball and also mixes in a curve and changeup.

See also
 List of Major League Baseball players from Japan

References

External links

NPB

1991 births
Living people
American League All-Stars
Buffalo Bisons (minor league) players
Japanese expatriate baseball players in the United States
Major League Baseball pitchers
Melbourne Aces players
Nippon Professional Baseball pitchers
People from Morioka, Iwate
Saitama Seibu Lions players
Seattle Mariners players
Toronto Blue Jays players
Japanese expatriate baseball players in Australia